Yellow Eyes is a 2009 military science fiction novel in John Ringo's Legacy of the Aldenata series, co-authored with Tom Kratman. The book, which is a spin-off of the main series, focuses on the Posleen invasion of Central America, with an emphasis on Panama. In contrast with other books in the series, emphasis is given to naval warfare, including the reactivation of the old warships USS Texas, USS Salem, and USS Des Moines.

Reception

The book was described by Publishers Weekly as a "breathless page-turner". Roland Green at Booklist praised the book's action scenes and described its military science as intelligent though "sometimes overly political".

References

External links 

2009 American novels
Novels by John Ringo
Legacy of the Aldenata
2009 science fiction novels
American science fiction novels
Military science fiction novels
Panama in fiction
Collaborative novels